The Endless River is a 2015 South African drama film directed by Oliver Hermanus. It was screened in the main competition section of the 72nd Venice International Film Festival. It is the first South African film to be nominated for the Golden Lion. It was also shown in the Contemporary World Cinema section of the 2015 Toronto International Film Festival.

Cast
 Nicolas Duvauchelle as Gilles Esteve
 Crystal-Donna Roberts as Tiny Solomons
 Clayton Evertson as Percy Solomons
 Darren Kelfkens as Capt. Groenewald
 Denise Newman as Mona

Production
Principal photography took place on location in the film's setting and namesake Riviersonderend. Other filming locations included Plettenberg Bay and Nature's Valley with interior scenes filmed in Paarl and Cape Town.

References

External links
 

2015 drama films
2015 films
2010s English-language films
English-language South African films
Films directed by Oliver Hermanus
Films shot in the Western Cape
South African drama films